David and Goliath (Italian: Davide e Golia) is an oil painting by the Venetian painter Titian. It was made in about 1542–1544 for the church of Santo Spirito, but is now in the basilica of Santa Maria della Salute.

Subject 
The Philistines had come up to make war against Saul and, as the rival camps lay opposite each other, the warrior Goliath came forth day by day to challenge to single combat. Only David ventured to respond, and armed with a sling and pebbles he overcame Goliath. The Philistines, seeing their champion killed, lost heart and were easily put to flight. The giant's arms were placed in the sanctuary, and it was his famous sword which David took with him in his flight from Saul.

History 

It was about the beginning of the 1540s that Titian received commissions for a great number of pictures from the brothers of Santo Spirito, who possessed the work of his early career, the San Marco Enthroned. One altarpiece represented the Descent of the Holy Spirit, but having been damaged had to be restored later by Titian. The picture on the same subject, which is now in the Church of the Salute, belongs to another period in Titian's activity. The whole collection of art treasures from Santo Spirito was transported to the Church of the Salute in the seventeenth century, where they remain today.

In the ceiling of the sacristy of the Salute, above the altar, are three creations of this period: Cain and Abel, Abraham and Isaac, and David and Goliath.

Analysis 
Georg Gronau writes of these three pictures collectively:

See also 
 David and Goliath (Caravaggio)
 David and Goliath (Artemisia Gentileschi)

References

Sources 

 Biadene, Susanna, ed. (1990). "Ceiling of the Church of Santo Spirito in Isola". Translated by Hecker, Sharon; Rylands, Philip; Wilkins, Elizabeth. In Titian: Prince of Painters. Italy: Prestel. pp. 255–56.
 Chisholm, Hugh, ed. (1911). "Goliath". Encyclopædia Britannica. Vol. 12 (11th ed.). Cambridge University Press. p. 225.
 Gronau, Georg (1904). Titian. London: Duckworth and Co; New York: Charles Scribner's Sons. pp. 123–25, 300.
 Kahr, Madlyn (1966). "Titian's Old Testament Cycle". Journal of the Warburg and Courtauld Institutes, 29: pp. 193–205. 
 Ricketts, Charles (1910). Titian. London: Methuen & Co. Ltd. pp. 102, 103.

1540s paintings
Paintings by Titian
Paintings depicting David